"Forever May You Run" is the second single from Gavin Rossdale's 2008 album WANDERlust. The single was released in April 2009, almost one year after Rossdale's previous single, "Love Remains the Same", which was released in May 2008.

Gavin performed his new single live at The Ellen DeGeneres Show on 21 March 2009. A music video for the song was released on 28 April 2009. Gavin's first son (Kingston) cameos in the video at 2:23.

Charts

References

External links
 Gavin Rossdale Official Site

2009 singles
Songs written by Linda Perry
Songs written by Gavin Rossdale
2008 songs
Interscope Records singles
Song recordings produced by Bob Rock